Pobedim is a village and municipality in Nové Mesto nad Váhom District in the Trenčín Region of western Slovakia. A Slavic hill fort from the pre-Great Moravian period has been uncovered in the locality Hradištia. The hill fort belongs to Early Medieval sites with the highest number of artifacts found in Slovakia.

Geography
The municipality lies at an altitude of 169 metres and covers an area of 8.609 km2. It has a population of about 1,218 people.

History
The village was first mentioned in 1392, but the area was occasionally inhabited from the Late Stone Age. The settlement is documented also from the Early Bronze Age and especially in the Late Bronze Age. The people of Lusatian culture built their settlement in the local swamps and left numerous artifacts (cultic artifacts, metallurgical tools, fragments of bronze, ceramics, etc.). The area was then settled by the Celts. In the Roman period, it was more or less uninhabited and only one finding is known from the Migration period.

The locality had been intensively colonized by the Slavs at the end of the 5th and in the 6th century (localities Horné Pole and Dolné Pole).  The Slavic hill fort was built at the end of the 8th century and was destroyed for the first time at the end of the first third the 9th century. The destruction of the hill fort is usually associated with the unification of the Principality of Nitra and the Principality of Moravia (the attack of Mojmír's army or Pribina's attack preceding his expulsion, depending on principality to which is Pobedim attributed; neither destruction during other internal conflict related to integration processes of the Slavs cannot be excluded). Radiocarbon dating indices that construction activities were realized also in the turnover of the 9th/10th century.

The hill fort consists of two parts, probably not built at once. The whole hill fort was protected by 3 meters high wall with a palisade on top and external ditch. An archeological research uncovered 114 graves from the Early Middle Ages, residential buildings, outbuildings, workshops and in particular, one of the largest collection of ceramics from the 9th century in Slovakia. Twenty large metal depots contained hundreds of old Slavic hrivnas (semifinished iron products), tools, stirrups, keys and further artifacts. Weapons except axes are nearly missing what led to a hypothesis that the depots were hidden before an external attack and weapons were left for defense.

Nowadays, the area of the hill fort is a part of an agricultural field. The findings can be seen in the local museum in Pobedim.

References

Sources

External links

http://www.e-obce.sk/obec/pobedim/pobedim.html
http://www.pobedim.sk - official site of Pobedim

Villages and municipalities in Nové Mesto nad Váhom District
Great Moravia